Guillermo León Delgado (born 8 July 1994) is a Spanish footballer.

Career

Youth & College
Delgado played four years of college soccer at the University of Delaware between 2013 and 2016. Delgado is one of the most decorated student-athletes in University of Delaware history, finishing his four-year career with the Blue Hens as the school's all-time leader in five statistical categories: points, goals, assists, game-winning goals, and shots.

While at college, Delgado played with USL PDL sides Reading United & Seattle Sounders FC U-23.

Professional 
On 13 January 2017, Delgado was selected 27th overall in the 2017 MLS SuperDraft by Chicago Fire. However, he wasn't signed by the club.

Delgado joined United Soccer League side Rio Grande Valley FC Toros in March 2018. He made his professional debut on 16 March 2018 in a 1–1 draw with Saint Louis FC.

On 28 January 2019, Delgado joined FC Tucson ahead of their first season in USL League One.

References

External links 
 Guillermo Delgado at Delaware Blue Hens
 
 
 
 

1994 births
Living people
Association football forwards
Chicago Fire FC draft picks
Delaware Blues Hens men's soccer players
Expatriate soccer players in the United States
Rio Grande Valley FC Toros players
Seattle Sounders FC U-23 players
Spanish expatriate footballers
Spanish footballers
Footballers from Madrid
USL Championship players
USL League Two players
FC Tucson players
USL League One players